Agra is a town in the Sindh province of Pakistan. It is located at 27°24'0N 68°23'0E with an altitude of 47 metres (157 feet).

References

Populated places in Sindh